Cynariognathus (meaning puppy jaw) is an extinct genus of middle sized carnivorous therocephalian from the Tapinocephalus Assemblage Zone of South Africa. It is sometimes considered a synonym of Pristerognathus.

See also
 List of therapsids

References

Scylacosaurids
Therocephalia genera
Guadalupian synapsids
Guadalupian synapsids of Africa
Guadalupian genus first appearances
Guadalupian genus extinctions